Riders of the Deadline is a 1943 American Western film directed by Lesley Selander and written by Bennett Cohen. The film stars William Boyd, Andy Clyde, Jimmy Rogers, Frances Woodward, Robert Mitchum, Richard Crane, Anthony Warde and William Halligan. The film was released on December 3, 1943, by United Artists.

Plot
Texas Ranger Tim  Mason (Richard Crane) is killed on the Mexican border for refusing to allow a wagonload of stolen goods to cross his land. Ranger Hopalong Cassidy (William Boyd)  is accused of the murder, and goes undercover to help Tim’s sister Sue (Frances Woodward), who is unaware that her barn is being used to store stolen goods.

Cast 
 William Boyd as Hopalong Cassidy
 Andy Clyde as California Carson
 Jimmy Rogers as Jimmy Rogers
 Frances Woodward as Sue Mason
 Robert Mitchum as Nick Drago
 Richard Crane as Tim Mason
 Anthony Warde as Gunner Madigan
 William Halligan as Banker Simon Crandall
 Hugh Prosser as Sheriff Gilcrest 
 Herbert Rawlinson as Ranger Captain Jennings
 Jack Rockwell as Tex 
 Earle Hodgins as Sourdough
 Montie Montana as Ranger Private Calhoun

References

External links 
 
 
 
 

1943 films
American black-and-white films
1940s English-language films
Films directed by Lesley Selander
United Artists films
American Western (genre) films
1943 Western (genre) films
Hopalong Cassidy films
Films scored by Paul Sawtell
1940s American films